Brian Litt is a Professor of Neurology, Neurosurgery and Bioengineering at the Perelman School of Medicine and University of Pennsylvania. He is the former 
director of the Penn Epilepsy Center, and is director of the Center for Neuroengineering and Therapeutics.

Most cited papers
Kim DH, Viventi J, Amsden JJ, Xiao J, Vigeland L, Kim YS, Blanco JA, Panilaitis B, Frechette ES, Contreras D, Kaplan DL.  [etc/] Dissolvable films of silk fibroin for ultrathin conformal bio-integrated electronics. Nature materials. 2010 Jun;9(6):511-7. According to Google Scholar, it has been cited 1364 times.
 Viventi J, Kim DH, Vigeland L, Frechette ES, Blanco JA, Kim YS, Avrin AE, Tiruvadi VR, Hwang SW, Vanleer AC, Wulsin DF. [etc] Flexible, foldable, actively multiplexed, high-density electrode array for mapping brain activity in vivo. Nature neuroscience. 2011 Dec;14(12):1599. According to Google Scholar, it has been cited 935 times.  
Litt B, Echauz J. Prediction of epileptic seizures. The Lancet Neurology. 2002 May 1;1(1):22-30. According to Google Scholar, it has been cited 474 times.  
Kerrigan JF, Litt B, Fisher RS, Cranstoun S, French JA, Blum DE, Dichter M, Shetter A, Baltuch G, Jaggi J, Krone S. Electrical stimulation of the anterior nucleus of the thalamus for the treatment of intractable epilepsy. Epilepsia. 2004 Apr;45(4):346-54. . According to Google Scholar, it has been cited 433 times.

Awards and recognition 

 2020: NIH Director's Pioneer Award
2015: American Epilepsy Society's Research Recognition Award for Clinical Science
2013: Brain Research Foundation's Scientific Innovations Award

References 

Perelman School of Medicine at the University of Pennsylvania faculty
Johns Hopkins School of Medicine alumni
Harvard College alumni
1960 births
Living people